François Degelas (10 July 1928 – 19 November 2004) was a Belgian footballer. He played in four matches for the Belgium national football team from 1955 to 1957.

References

External links
 

1928 births
2004 deaths
Belgian footballers
Belgium international footballers
Place of birth missing
Association football midfielders